Baijnath is a small town on the banks of the Gomati river in the Bageshwar district in Kumaon division of Uttarakhand, India. The place is most noted for its ancient temples, which have been recognized as Monuments of National Importance by the Archaeological Survey of India in Uttarakhand. Baijnath has been selected as one of the four places to be connected by the 'Shiva Heritage Circuit' in Kumaon, under the Swadesh Darshan Scheme of the Government of India.

Baijnath, then known as Kartikeyapura, was the seat of the Katyuri kings who ruled over an area consisting of combined parts of Garhwal and Kumaun in modern-day state of Uttarakhand, India and Doti in Modern day Nepal.

History

The first permanent settlement of the area was a town named Karvirpur or Karbirpur. The ruins of this town were used by Katyuri King Narsingh Deo to establish his capital in the area. Baijnath remained the capital of Katyuri Dynasty, who ruled the area from 7th-13th century AD., it was then known as Kartikeyapura. The katyuri kingdom then consisted of combined parts of Garhwal and Kumaun in modern-day state of Uttarakhand, India and Doti in Modern day Nepal.

After death of Birdeo the last king  of united katyuri kingdom. the kingdom disintegrated in the 13th century giving rise to 8 different princely states. Baijnath remained under the rule of Baijnath Katyurs descendants of Katyuri kings, till 1565 until king Balo Kalyan Chand of Almora annexed Baijnath to Kumaon.

The Gorkhas of Nepal while expanding their kingdom westwards across Kali River, invaded and overran Almora, the seat of the Kumaon Kingdom and other parts of Kumaon in 1791. In 1816, the Gorkhas were defeated by the East India Company in Anglo-Nepalese War in 1814 and were forced to cede Kumaon to the British as part of the Treaty of Sugauli.

It was a small village with a population of 148 in 1901 although it has grown somewhat since.

Geography

It has an average elevation of 1,130 metres (3,707 feet). Baijnath is situated in the Katyur valley of the Kumaon Himalayas at the left bank of Gomati river. Nearby villages include Dangoli, Gagrigol, Haat, Teet Bazar, Purara, Noghar, etc.

An artificial lake near the temple compound was announced in 2007-2008. It was completed and inaugurated on 14 January 2016 by Harish Rawat, the then Chief Minister of Uttarakhand. The lake is full of "Golden Mahaseer" fishes. Although fishing is strictly restricted at this site, the lake is a major tourist attraction where tourists offer chana to fishes. The nearby market is Garur which is supposed to be one of the oldest in the region.

Heritage
The temple is significant to Hindus because of mythology concerning its location near a river.

There is a famous Baijnath Mandir (Lord Shiva) on the bank of the river which is said to have been built by the Kumaon Katyuri king in around 1150 A.D. and it was Capital of the Katyuri dynasty of kings who ruled Uttaranchal during 12th and 13th century, Baijnath was once known as Kartikyapura. One of the most important places to visit in Baijnath is the historically and religiously significant Baijnath Temple constructed in the twelfth century. The temple holds significance because, according to Hindu mythology, Lord Shiva and Parvati were married at the confluence of River Gomati and Garur Ganga. Dedicated to SivaVaidyanatha, the Lord of Physicians, the Baijnath temple is actually a temples’ complex built by the Katyuri kings with the idols of Shiva, Ganesh, Parvati, Chandika, Kuber, Surya and Brahma. Also the town of Baijnath draws its name from the temple. Situated on the left bank of the Gomti River at an elevation of 1,126 m, the temples are constructed in stone. The main temple that houses a beautiful idol of Parvati is chiseled in black stone. The temple is approached from the riverside by a flight of steps made of stones constructed by the orders of a Katyuri queen. On the way to the main temple, just below the house of the Mahanta, is the temple of Bamani. Legend goes that the temple was built by a Brahmin woman and dedicated to Lord Shiva. it is believed that it was built in one night by katyuri kings.

Around 2 km from Baijnath there is a temple of Bhagwati Mata Kot Bhramri Devi Temple or (Kot Ka Mandir) (traces of Ma Bhramri can be found in the last two paragraph of Chapter Eleven of Durga Shaptashati Path - The most sacred Hindu Book equivalent to Gita and Ramayana), which once was a fort owned by the Katyuri Kings. Also there is a myth that Adiguru Shankaracharya stayed on this temple overnight while en route to Badrinath. There is widespread belief among the local populace that the goddess, (after whom the temple is named) Kot Bhramri Devi's, Goddess face should not be shown to anyone except the priest of the temple if not followed this advice the entire Katur Valley will face ill luck and massive disaster will follow hence backside of the goddess is worshipped, except during the annual festival of "Nandaashtmi" during Bhadrapad Ashtami or Radha Ashtami during September month (the state government declares as State holiday) or when the Raj Jaat Yatra which takes place once in twelve year. Since last 150 Years buffalo and Lamb used to be sacrificed in the name of Nandaashtami has been stopped by The Honorable High Court of Nainital on a Public Interest Litigation filed by Animal Protection Society and as a result under police protection this practice has stopped. Though the Goddess Ma Bhramri is Satvik but some 200 years back during Nepalese Invasasion and their Kingdom, local deity Ma Nandadevi's status got installed at Kot Bhramri Mandir as a result animal sacrifice got started some 200 years back.

Commerce and tourism
For travelers, there are good lodging and boarding facilities at Baijnath with budget accommodation at the state run Tourist Reception Centre (TRC) and good rooms with all modern amenities can be availed at very cheap rates. Two kilometres further is a heli-pad facility for emergency landing for state and defence usage.

The chief occupation of its inhabitants are pensioners from retired services, State Government Teachers, Bankers, Post Officer Employees, Forest Services, agriculture, retired and serving defence personnel, petty and large shopkeepers dealing into day to day items and tea stall owners, butchers and finally point small scale taxi services.

There is a nearby market at Dangoli but main market remains two kilometers away at Garur which caters to household items, daily use goods to people and is considered to be biggest market place in the region after Almora, Ranikhet and Bageshwar District in Kumaon Hills up to Karanprayag District in Garhwal.

The market of Garur is one of the oldest in the region (since pre-independence days of the British Rule in India, but the market expanded during 1970 to 2010 with the efforts of local area people. In this area Mohan Chandra Joshi is a well known Poet, notable social worker and another one industrialist K D Pandey is also known for his vast development for Garur. In 2011 the major banks and other government services - the polytechnic, post office and the only ATM of the region are situated in the property owned by the Pandey Family. One can find modern shopping complex recently came up in Garur market build up by the Pharswan family. Primarily, Garur is the last recognised and biggest Kumaon market prior to entering Garhwal via Kumaon en route to Garur Gwaldam road.

Transport
Pantnagar Airport, located in Pantnagar is the nearest Airport, while Kathgodam railway station is the nearest railway station to Baijnath. Baijnath is located at the junction of the Bageshwar-Gwaldam and the Almora-Gopeshwar road. It is connected to Haldwani, Bhimtal, Almora and Ranikhet by the 'Kumaun Darshan' service of Uttarakhand Transport Corporation.

From Baijnath en route to Bageshwar Bridge which is motorable route up to 'Song' at sub town place called Kapkot whereby thousands of foreign as well as domestic trackers come to trek on Sunderdhunga as well as Pindari Glaciers which are within a trekable distance of one hundred km (fifty Up and fifty down trek on foot).

A discussion is being held on laying a railway track between Tanakpur to Bageshwar which if materialised would bring this district on faster national connectivity and invite much larger tourist population by 2020.

Image Gallery

References

External links
 Baijnath Temple Uttarakhand

Cities and towns in Bageshwar district
Tourism in Uttarakhand